Hutiaoxia Town, formerly Qiaotou (桥头 Qiáotóu; lit. "Bridgehead"), is a small town located on the Yangtze River in Shangri-La County (formerly Zhongdian County) adjacent to Lijiang City, Yunnan Province, China. Hutiaoxia is the south end of the famous Tiger Leaping Gorge hiking route, the other end of which is Daju in Lijiang. There are several buses to Shangri-La County which pass through Hutiaoxia.

The residents of Hutiaoxia are immigrant Chinese who in history escaped to this remote area from war in inland China. Since the hiking business boomed here, a lot of restaurants, cafes, and charter cabs companies have appeared. Most tourists who visit the Upper Tiger Leaping Gorge also stop here to dine and rest.

External links
Located at 

Township-level divisions of Dêqên Tibetan Autonomous Prefecture